Scotswood Bridge is one of the main bridges crossing the River Tyne in North East England. It links the west end of Newcastle upon Tyne on the north bank of the river with the MetroCentre and Blaydon  in Gateshead on the south bank.

The Chain Bridge 

The first bridge across the river at this location was the Old Scotswood Bridge, or "The Chain Bridge" as it was known locally. It was a suspension bridge with two stone towers, from which the road deck was suspended by chains. It was passed by parliament in 1829 and designed by John Green, with construction beginning that year. It was opened on 16 April 1831.

The bridge was freed from tolls in 1907. In 1931 the bridge needed to be strengthened and widened. The bridge eventually proved too narrow for the traffic it needed to carry and its increasing repair costs proved too much. After standing for 136 years, it was closed and demolished in 1967 after its replacement had been completed.

Current bridge 

A replacement for the Chain Bridge had been proposed as early as 1941. Permission was finally granted in 1960, and authorised by an Act of Parliament, the Scotswood Bridge Act 1962.  A new bridge was designed by Mott, Hay and Anderson and built by Mitchell Construction and Dorman Long. Construction commenced on 18 September 1964. It was built slightly to the west of the Chain Bridge, which continued operating during the new bridge's construction. The bridge was opened on 20 March 1967. It is a box girder bridge, supported by two piers in the river and carries a dual carriageway road.  Combined costs for demolition of the old bridge and construction of the new one were £2.5 million.

Scotswood Bridge carried the traffic of the Gateshead A69 western by-pass from 1970 up until the construction of Blaydon Bridge  and the new A1 in 1990.  Between June 1971 and January 1974 traffic on the bridge was limited to single file to enable strengthening work to take place, which was needed to address design concerns. It has required further strengthening and repairs a number of times since; between 1979 and 1980, in 1983 and in 1990.

References 

 

Bridges in Tyne and Wear
Bridges completed in 1967
Buildings and structures in Newcastle upon Tyne
Crossings of the River Tyne
Through arch bridges in the United Kingdom
Box girder bridges in the United Kingdom
Scotswood
Transport in Newcastle upon Tyne
Former toll bridges in England